Perponda is a town and locality in the Australian state of South Australia located about  east of the state capital of Adelaide.

The 2016 Australian census which was conducted in August 2016 reports that Perponda had a population of 60 people.

History
Perponda was on the Waikerie railway line. The school opened in 1924, but has since closed. The town was surveyed in 1919 and the name is derived from the local Aboriginal word for the plains. The modern locality area includes the former town of Kalyan which was the next siding north along the railway.

References

Towns in South Australia